Doruklu is a town in Toroslar district of Mersin Province (The capital of Toroslar district is actually in Greater Mersin.) The population of Doruklu was 545  as of 2019. Most of the village inhabitants are actually Turkmen( Turkmen) origin

References

İsmail Uysal
Villages in Toroslar District